Ramiro Suárez (born 7 June 1947) is a Spanish boxer. He competed in the men's bantamweight event at the 1968 Summer Olympics.

References

1947 births
Living people
Spanish male boxers
Olympic boxers of Spain
Boxers at the 1968 Summer Olympics
Sportspeople from Las Palmas
Mediterranean Games bronze medalists for Spain
Mediterranean Games medalists in boxing
Competitors at the 1967 Mediterranean Games
Bantamweight boxers
20th-century Spanish people